Parastenolechia albicapitella is a moth of the family Gelechiidae. It is found in Korea.

The wingspan is 10.5–11.5 mm. The forewings are shiny white, with dark brown subbasal fascia and rather small somewhat triangular costal patch. The postmedian patch is triangular and connected with the tornal patch. A small dark brown or white dot of erected scales is found beneath the cell. The hindwings are grey.

Etymology
The species name refers to the shiny whitish head and is derived from Latin albus (meaning white) and capitis (meaning head).

References

Moths described in 2000
Parastenolechia